Lovers Concerto is the tenth studio album by Japanese pop band Deen. It was released on 2 December 2009 under Ariola Japan.

Background
This is the band first release under music label Ariola Japan.

The album consists of two previously released single, Celebrate and Negai. Both of those singles has received special album rearrangement under album Album version.

This album was released in two formats: regular CD edition and limited CD+DVD edition. The limited edition is for the first time released in Blu-spec CD format. In DVD disc is the footage of their live performance Deen Unplugged Summer Resort Live'09.

Charting performance
The album reached #21 in its first week and charted for 3 weeks, selling 8,000+ copies.

Track listing

In media
Celebrate - ending theme for Tokyo Broadcasting System Television program Megami Search

References

Sony Music albums
Japanese-language albums
2009 albums
Deen (band) albums